The Adolph Islands are a group of small islands and rocks off northwest Watkins Island, in the Biscoe Islands. Mapped from air photos by Falkland Islands and Dependencies Aerial Survey Expedition (FIDASE) (1956–57). Named by United Kingdom Antarctic Place-Names Committee (UK-APC) for the American Edward F. Adolph, Professor of Physiology, University of Rochester, 1948–60, who specialized in the reactions of the human body to cold.

See also 
 List of Antarctic and sub-Antarctic islands

References

Islands of the Biscoe Islands